Malta Protectorate was the political term for Malta when it was de jure part of the Kingdom of Sicily but under British protection. This protectorate existed between the capitulation of the French forces in Malta in 1800 and the transformation of the islands to the Crown Colony of Malta in 1813.

Background 

During the Maltese uprising against the French, the Maltese people formed a National Assembly as a provisional government. Messengers were sent to the British fleet in Sicily for help, and a British convoy consisting of 13 battered ships under Captain Sir James Saumarez appeared off the island in late September 1798. In October Sir Alexander Ball arrived in Malta, and a year later he was appointed as Civil Commissioner.

The French garrison under General Vaubois had been driven to Mosta, and finally surrendered on 4 September 1800. Malta therefore became a British Protectorate. In August 1801, the Civil Commissioner, Charles Cameron, appointed Emmanuel Vitale as Governor of commino instead of Saverio Cassar.

Under the terms of the 1802 Treaty of Amiens with France, Britain was supposed to evacuate the islands, but failed to keep this obligation — one of several mutual cases of non-adherence to the treaty, which eventually led to its collapse and the resumption of war between the two countries.

Declaration of Rights 

In June 1802, 104 representatives from the Maltese towns and villages signed a declaration entitled  (The Declaration of Rights of the inhabitants of the Islands of Malta and Gozo) by which they proclaimed George III to be their king, and that he had no right to surrender Malta to another power. By the Declaration they also proclaimed that Malta should be self-governing while under British protection.

Lampedusa 

Politically, Lampedusa was also part of the Kingdom of Sicily. In the late 18th century, while Malta was still under the Knights, the Prince of Lampedusa had let the island to Salvatore Gatt, a Maltese entrepreneur, who settled on the island with a few Maltese workers.

The British considered taking over Lampedusa as a naval base instead of Malta, but the idea was dropped as the island did not have deep harbours and was not well developed. Despite this, the authorities in Malta and the British government still attempted to take over the island as they believed that it could be used to supply Malta with food in case Sicily fell to Napoleon.

In 1800, Ball sent a Commissariat to Lampedusa to assess the feasibility of this and the result was that the island could easily be used to supply Malta with food at a relatively low cost as there was grazing ground and an adequate water supply. In 1803, some Maltese farmers settled on Lampedusa with cattle and sheep, and they began to grow barley.

In 1810, Salvatore Gatt transferred the lease to Alexander Fernandez, the British Commissariat, and the latter attempted to create a large Maltese colony on the island. This never materialized as a Royal Commission in 1812 stated that this was just a business venture and Britain refused to help Fernandez. Further problems arose when the plague devastated Malta in 1813–14, and on 25 September 1814, Sir Thomas Maitland withdrew British troops from Lampedusa.

Fernandez remained proprietor of the island until 1818, when Gatt returned and remained there with his family up to 1824.

Crown Colony 
In 1813 the island was transformed into a British Crown colony by the Bathurst Constitution. On 23 July Sir Thomas Maitland replaced Sir Hildebrand Oakes and was the first Civil Commissioner to be given the title of "Governor". Malta officially became a colony by the Treaty of Paris in 1814.

See also 
Ġonna tal-Kmand
1806 Birgu polverista explosion
Froberg mutiny

References

External links

1800 establishments in Malta
1813 disestablishments in Malta
Malta and the Commonwealth of Nations
Malta–United Kingdom relations
Protectorate
Kingdom of Sicily
Malta Protectorate
States and territories established in 1800
States and territories disestablished in 1813